Guy Auguste de Rohan-Chabot known as the comte de Chabot (18 August 1683 – 13 September 1760), often referred to as Chevalier de Rohan, was a French nobleman most notable for an altercation with Voltaire.

He was the son of Louis de Rohan-Chabot, Duc de Rohan, Prince de Leon and Marie Élisabeth du Bec-Crespin de Grimaldi, Marquise de Vardes.

Guy Auguste married twice, first Yvonne Sylvie Breil de Rays (1712 – 15 July 1740) on 7 February 1729, with whom he fathered two sons, Louis Antoine Auguste and Charles. After his wife's death he married Mary Apolonia Scolastica Stafford-Howard (17 February 1721 – 16 May 1769) on 25 May 1744.

He died in 1760 Paris, France. His son Louis Antoine succeeded Guy Auguste's father as the Duke of Rohan.

Altercation with Voltaire

Guy-Auguste is mostly remembered for an altercation with the young Voltaire in 1725, in which both men insulted each other. He then hired some thugs to assault Voltaire while he watched from his carriage. The aristocratic Rohan family obtained a lettre de cachet from French King Louis XV and used this warrant to force Voltaire first into imprisonment in the Bastille and then into exile in Great Britain.

References

Counts of France
1683 births
1760 deaths
Guy Auguste
Guy Auguste